The London and North Western Railway (LNWR) Class E was a class of 2-8-0 steam locomotives in service between 1904 and 1928.

History

26 were rebuilt by George Whale from Class B 4-cylinder compounds with the simple addition of a leading pony truck to reduce excessive front overhang between 1904-1908. The only alteration was to wheelbase and weight, but when the letter classification system was introduced in 1911, this took them into a different class.

Two of Class Es were further rebuilt to Class Fs by the replacement of the 4'3" diameter boiler with a larger 5'2" diameter boiler; these being 1038 in 1907 and 647 in 1908.

From 1917, Charles Bowen Cooke started to rebuild the remaining 24 Class Es into LNWR Class G1 0-8-0s with simple expansion engines.  12 had been so treated by the grouping of 1923, and a further pair were treated in January and February of that year.  Of the remaining ten Class Es, the LMS allocated them the numbers 9600-9.  A further four were rebuilt to Class G1 in 1923-4, while the remaining six engines were withdrawn still as Class Es in 1927/8, two of them never receiving their allocated LMS No.  None was preserved.

List of locomotives

LMS numbers in parentheses were not carried prior to rebuilding as G1 or withdrawal.

Notes

References

Further reading

External links 
 LNWRS Webb page on the Class E (NB lifetime is incorrect as it includes G1 rebuilds)

E
2-8-0 locomotives
Compound locomotives
Railway locomotives introduced in 1904
Standard gauge steam locomotives of Great Britain
1′D n4v locomotives
Freight locomotives